Host and Guest (Georgian: სტუმარ-მასპინძელი, St’umar-Masp’indzeli) is an epic poem by the Georgian poet, writer and philosopher Vazha-Pshavela. The poem was first published in 1893 in Tbilisi, and it is considered to be the "masterpiece of the Georgian literature". It is compulsory reading in Georgian schools. A film based on the poem was made in 1967 by Tengiz Abuladze.

Content 

Though the host, Joqola, is Muslim, and his guest, Zviadauri, is Christian, the poem refers only very vaguely to their differing religious and cultural traditions. It is more about the intertwining of their fates – and the great dignity with which they face their inevitable ends – once they've tripped the wire of their communities' savage, mutual loathing.

Joqola and Zviadauri meet by accident in a damp forest – the ensemble, holding treelike poles and swaying in shadow to a sad mountain melody, remains one of Synetic's most mystical images – where both are hunting for deer. These are men who value action over words, so the clipped exchanges Reed writes for them convey an earthy stoicism. After Joqola invites his new companion to his home, to gut and celebrate their kill, their joy is evoked in a virile, ritualized dance.

In the manner of all kinds of knee-jerk vengefulness, things quickly fall apart for them and Joqola's wife, Aghaza. The village, outraged at Joqola's flouting of the taboo against giving comfort to the enemy, rally around the rabble-rousing elder Musa, who demands that Joqola turn over his guest to them. The dissident Joqola, however, citing the revered local mandate for civility and hospitality – "The guest", he recites, "will be the last to die" – refuses. So the fuse is lighted.

The descent into calamity is orchestrated with a paradoxical beauty. From a sacrifice conducted in the village cemetery to the outfitting of combatants in the rival village, each stylized sequence builds hypnotically on the one before. Drumbeats and ethereal recorded voices further cement the tension.

Text and translations 
This poem is translated into several languages, including: English (by Donald Rayfield, Venera Urushadze, Lela Jgerenaia, Nino Ramishvili, and others), French (by Gaston Bouatchidzé), Russian (by Nikolay Zabolotsky, V. Derzhavin, Osip Mandelshtam, Boris Pasternak, S. Spassky, Marina Tsvetaeva, and others), German, Spanish, Italian, Japanese and other languages.

The poem begins:

The poem ends:

Full text 
See this for English translation by Lela Jgerenaia: Vazha-Pshavela (1861–1915) - Host and Guest

Film adaptations 
The first film version of the poem as a feature was produced in 1967. The film version made by Tengiz Abuladze in 1967 was his great cinematic success in Georgia.

See also 
 Kist people
 Khevsurians
 1893 in poetry

Notes

External links
 Poem's free text translated by Lela Jgerenaia
 ABOUT LITERATURE – VAZHA-PSHAVELA 
 The Plea review



1893 poems
Epic poems in Georgian
Works by Vazha-Pshavela
Poems set in Georgia (country)